Niniola Apata (born 15 December 1986), known professionally as Niniola, is a Nigerian singer and songwriter. She participated in the sixth season of Project Fame West Africa in 2013. After releasing her debut single "Ibadi", she was nominated for Most Promising Act to Watch at the 2015 Nigeria Entertainment Awards.

Early life 
Niniola Apata was born to the family of Rt. Brigadier General Simeon Olaosebikan Apata (late) and Mrs. Margaret Apata on 15 december 1986 and raised in Lagos State, Nigeria. She is the direct elder sister to Teni.

Education 
Niniola began her education both primary and secondary school education at Apata Memorial High School, and she earned a bachelor of education certificate from the University of Lagos. She comes from a polygamous family where she was the sixth of ten children, raised by three mothers and a father who was killed in 1995.

Career
Niniola participated in several social activities and competitions while attending secondary school. She finished third runner-up in the sixth season of Project Fame West Africa. During the competition, she performed a live rendition of "Limpopo" with Kcee and her Cobhams Asuquo-produced track "Itura". She has cited Dolly Parton, Whitney Houston, Celine Dion, The Cranberries, Madonna, Beyoncé and Angélique Kidjo as her key musical influences.

Niniola released her debut single "Ibadi" on 19 March 2014. Produced by Sarz, the song received positive critical reviews, topped national music charts and gained extensive  airplay. Her singles "Ibadi" and "Gbowode" were included in the soundtrack for season 2 of Gidi Up. NotJustOk included her on its list of the 15 Artists to Watch in 2015. Niniola was nominated in the Most Promising Act to Watch category at the 2015 Nigeria Entertainment Awards.

Niniola released the Sarz-produced single "Maradona" in 2017. The song spent 13 weeks on South Africa's Metro FM chart, retaining the number 1 position for 6 weeks.
Niniola earned nominations at the 2018 BET Awards and SAMAs for "Maradona". 
In 2018 DJ Snake teamed up with Niniola and created Maradona Riddim a remix to her previously released hit Maradona. She received nods from Canadian rapper Drake and American record producer Timbaland.

In 2019, elements of "Maradona" were sampled in "Find Your Way Back", a song from Beyoncé's soundtrack album The Lion King: The Gift. Niniola is also credited as one of the track's songwriters and composers. 

In April 2020, she received her Grammy nomination certificate for her work as a composer on The Lion King: The Gift.

In June 2021, she received her Grammy second nomination certificate for her work as a composer on The Lion King: The Gift. In the same month Niniola got inducted into the Grammy Recording Academy Class of 2021.

In July 2021, Niniola's single, "Maradona" was certified gold in South Africa by the Recording Industry of South Africa RISA.

Artistry
Niniola describes her style of music as Afro-house, a blend of Afrobeat and house music. In an interview with Gbolahan Adeyemi of NGWide in 2015, she stated she loves singing in Yoruba because it makes the song delivery beautiful.

Personal life 
Niniola is the older sister of singer Teni.

Discography

Collaborative albums and EPs

This is Me (2017)
Colours and Sounds (2020)
6th Heaven (EP) (2021)
Lagos to Jozi (EP) (2021)

Awards and nominations

See also
List of Nigerian musicians

References

External links

Living people
Yoruba women musicians
21st-century Nigerian women singers
University of Lagos alumni
Musicians from Lagos State
People from Ekiti State
Yoruba-language singers
English-language singers from Nigeria
Nigerian women singer-songwriters
1986 births